Matthew Henry Richey (June 10, 1828 – February 21, 1911) was a Canadian politician in the 19th century.

Richey was the son of Matthew Richey, Methodist minister from Nova Scotia. The family was of Ulster-Scottish ancestry, his father having immigrated to Canada.

Richey studied law in Windsor, Ontario and Upper Canada, was called to the bar in 1850 and practised law in Halifax. He served on the city council and was twice elected mayor of Halifax.

Richey was a Conservative politician and in 1878 he was elected to the Parliament of Canada. In 1883, he became the fifth Lieutenant Governor of Nova Scotia, a position he held until 1888.

External links 

1828 births
1911 deaths
Lawyers in Nova Scotia
Conservative Party of Canada (1867–1942) MPs
Lieutenant Governors of Nova Scotia
Mayors of Halifax, Nova Scotia
Members of the House of Commons of Canada from Nova Scotia
Canadian people of Ulster-Scottish descent